The List of shipwrecks in the 1740s includes some ships sunk, wrecked or otherwise lost during the 1740s.

1740
1740 did not begin on 1 January!

May

1 May

24 May

January

9 January

23 January

26 January

Unknown date

February

8 February

Unknown date

March

13 March

Unknown date

September

27 September

Unknown date

November

18 November

1741

February

12 February

March

26 March

April

24 April

Unknown date

May

9 May

14 May

Unknown date

June

17 June

July

5 July

25 July

Unknown date

August

15 August

September

8 September

15 September

Unknown date

October

3 October

21 October

Unknown date

November

26 November

28 November

Unknown date

December

Unknown date

Unknown date

1742

April

16 April

June

July

29 July

September

2 September

Unknown date

November

22 November

December

25 December

January

11 January

Unknown date

1743

March

Unknown date

April

13 April

June

15 June

July

13 July

September

13 September

18 September

October

5 October

December

28 December

Unknown date

January

6 January

Unknown date

February

14 February

19 February

25 February

28 February

Unknown date

March

13 March

Unknown date

Unknown date

1744

January

Unknown date

February

11 February

April

Unknown date

July

8 July

Unknown date

August

17 August

29 August

Unknown date

September

5 September

16 September

Unknown date

October

5 October

21 October

26 October

Unknown date

November

Unknown date

December

3 December

19 December

Unknown date

February

5 February

22 February

Unknown date

1745

July

29 July

August

21 September

September

12 September

October

31 October

November

14 November

24 November

Unknown date

January

12 January

1746

June

24 June

August

Unknown date

September

1 September

16 September

October

28 October

December

Unknown date

January

20 January

Unknown date

February

4 February

16 February

Unknown date

Unknown date

1747

1748

1749

Notes
 Until 1752, the year began on Lady Day (25 March) Thus 24 March 1740 was followed by 25 March 1741. 31 December 1741 was followed by 1 January 1741.

References

1740s
 
 
 
 
 
 
 
Maritime incidents in 1747
Maritime incidents in 1748
Maritime incidents in 1749